Michael Francis is an Australian former rugby league footballer who played in the 1990s. He played for South Sydney in the New South Wales Rugby League (NSWRL) competition and for the London Broncos in the Rugby Football League Championship First Division.

Background
Francis played his junior rugby league for Lithgow and represented the Australian schoolboys team in 1992.

Playing career
Francis made his first grade debut for South Sydney in round 9 of the 1993 season against Parramatta at Parramatta Stadium.  During the 1995 off season, Francis played in England with the London Broncos in the last Rugby Football League Championship First Division season before the introduction of the Super League.

Francis played with Souths until the end of 1998 before departing the club.  He made nearly 100 appearances for the club across all grades.

References

Place of birth missing (living people)
Living people
1974 births
South Sydney Rabbitohs players
London Broncos players
Rugby league second-rows
Rugby league props
Australian rugby league players
Australian expatriate sportspeople in England